Msalato International Airport , is a proposed international airport project intended to serve the Tanzanian capital city of Dodoma located in Dodoma Region.

Location
The airport would occupy  of real estate.

Overview
Dodoma Airport, which serves the capital is located within the municipality and cannot accommodate larger aircraft. Due to the location of Dodoma Airport, it cannot be expanded easily. The government of Tanzania plans to construct an intentional airport in Msalato, to handle large passenger and cargo aircraft to carry politicians, diplomats, tourists and businesspeople together with their luggage.

Construction
After considering available alternatives, the Tanzanian government has decided to build a new greenfield international airport to serve the capital city of Dodoma, using money borrowed from the African Development Bank (AfDB).

The infrastructure involved includes a three storied terminal building for departing and arriving passengers, with capability of 1,500,000 arrivals annually. Also, arrival and departure gates, fencing, airport roads and car parking yards. Other operations infrastructure includes a control tower, radar equipment, a fire station and associated fire-fighting equipment, an aircraft fueling station, a water supply and distribution system, a dedicated electricity supply system with back-up (an alternative when the primary goes out) and a meteorology station.

Funding
The table below outlines the sources of financing for Msalato International Airport. * Note: All amounts in millions in United States Dollars.

See also
 Dodoma Airport

References

External links
 
 Tenders To Construct Msalato International Airport Postponed Until 14 July 2021

Proposed airports in Tanzania
Dodoma
Transport in Tanzania